Countess of Gloucester is a title that may be held by a woman in her own right or as wife of the Earl of Gloucester.

Women who have held the title include:

Countesses in their own right
Isabella, 3rd Countess of Gloucester (d. 1217), whose title was held by her husband (King John) after 1189, and again by her in her own right from 1216 onward.

Countesses by marriage
Mabel FitzRobert, Countess of Gloucester (c.1100-1157)
Isabel Marshal (1200-1240)
Maud de Lacy, Countess of Hertford and Gloucester (1223-1289)
Alice de Lusignan of Angoulême (c.1236-1290)
Joan of Acre (1272-1307)
Margaret de Clare (1293-1342)
Constance of York, Countess of Gloucester (c.1375-1416)